Two ships of the Royal Navy have been named HMS Rothesay, after the town of Rothesay in Scotland. 

  was a  launched in 1941 and broken up in 1950.
  was a  launched in 1957 and scrapped in 1988.

Royal Navy ship names